Guy Newman may refer to:

 Guy Newman (soccer) (born 1957), English-American soccer coach and former player
 Guy Newman (water polo) (born 1969), Australian former water polo player
 Guy D. Newman (1906–1988), American academic, Baptist preacher and university administrator